The 1988 Calgary Stampeders finished in 4th place in the West Division with a 6–12 record and missed the playoffs.

Offseason

CFL Draft

Preseason

Regular season

Season Standings

Season schedule

Awards and records

1988 CFL All-Stars

Western All-Star Selections

References

Calgary Stampeders seasons
Calgary Stampeders Season, 1988